Lafayette is a city in Nicollet County, Minnesota, United States. The population was 492 at the 2020 census. It is a farming community just outside the larger town of New Ulm.

Lafayette is part of the Mankato—North Mankato Metropolitan Statistical Area.

History
Lafayette was platted in 1897, and named for Gilbert du Motier, Marquis de Lafayette (1757–1834), a French and American Revolutionary War general.

Geography
The South Branch Rush River starts near Lafayette.

Minnesota State Highway 15 serves as a main route in the community.

Demographics

As of 2000 the median income for a household in the city was $36,719, and the median income for a family was $43,611. Males had a median income of $31,250 versus $21,563 for females. The per capita income for the city was $15,347.  About 3.1% of families and 2.9% of the population were below the poverty line, including 2.8% of those under age 18 and 7.0% of those age 95 or over.

2010 census
As of the census of 2010, there were 504 people, 218 households, and 131 families residing in the city. The racial makeup of the city was 97.8% White, 0.2% Native American, 0.2% Asian, 1.2% from other races, and 0.6% from two or more races. Hispanic or Latino of any race were 2.4% of the population.

There were 218 households, of which 33.0% had children under the age of 18 living with them, 47.2% were married couples living together, 4.6% had a female householder with no husband present, 8.3% had a male householder with no wife present, and 39.9% were non-families. 36.2% of all households were made up of individuals, and 20.6% had someone living alone who was 65 years of age or older. The average household size was 2.31 and the average family size was 2.95.

The median age in the city was 36.9 years. 27% of residents were under the age of 18; 6.2% were between the ages of 18 and 24; 25.6% were from 25 to 44; 26.3% were from 45 to 64; and 14.7% were 65 years of age or older. The gender makeup of the city was 49.4% male and 50.6% female.

Notable person
Lafayette was the childhood home of Tippi Hedren, the star of Alfred Hitchcock's The Birds.   In Hedren's book Cats of Shambala, she wrote that she was born in New Ulm, as Lafayette did not have a hospital.

References

Cities in Nicollet County, Minnesota
Mankato – North Mankato metropolitan area
New Ulm, Minnesota
Cities in Minnesota